Murray Charles Evans (June 23, 1919 – March 10, 2004) was an American football player and coach. He served as the head football coach at Hardin–Simmons University from 1952 to 1954, compiling a record of 15–14–2.

Evans died on March 10, 2004, in Abilene, Texas.

Head coaching record

College

References

External links
 
 Sports-Reference coach profile

1919 births
2004 deaths
American football quarterbacks
Detroit Lions players
Hardin–Simmons Cowboys football coaches
Hardin–Simmons Cowboys football players
People from Goodlettsville, Tennessee
People from Wichita County, Texas
Coaches of American football from Texas
Players of American football from Texas